Vinje Glacier is a broad glacier about 20 nautical miles (37 km) long flowing northwest between the Filchner Mountains and Fenriskjeften Mountain in Queen Maud Land. Mapped by Norwegian cartographers from surveys and air photos by the Norwegian Antarctic Expedition (1956–60) and named for T. Vinje, meteorologist with Norwegian Antarctic Expedition (1956–58).

See also
 List of glaciers in the Antarctic
 Glaciology

References
 

Glaciers of Queen Maud Land
Orvin Mountains